José Uilton Silva de Jesus (born 25 July 1992), better known as Zé Uilton, is a Brazilian professional footballer who plays as a forward for the club Paços de Ferreira.

Professional career
Uilton made his professional debut with Paços de Ferreira in a 2-0 LigaPro win over S.C. Braga B on 12 August 2018.

References

External links
 
 Profile

1992 births
Living people
Sportspeople from Bahia
Brazilian footballers
F.C. Paços de Ferreira players
Clube Recreativo e Atlético Catalano players
Associação Atlética Anapolina players
Primeira Liga players
Liga Portugal 2 players
Association football forwards
Brazilian expatriate footballers
Expatriate footballers in Portugal